Ori Murray is an American-born Israeli rapper, best known as the co-founder and rap vocalist of the band Shtar.

Early life
Murray was born in Seattle, Washington to an Irish father and a Jewish mother, although he was raised with little connection to Judaism. His father, Rod Murray, was a high-ranking martial arts instructor with a school in Seattle. Ori himself actively trained and competed in karate and other disciplines from a young age, including several years as a collegiate wrestler. He was introduced to hip hop through albums like Jurassic 5's Quality Control and the Rawkus Records compilation Lyricist Lounge 2, and was further influenced by his high school poetry class.

As a teenager, he would often get into fights at house parties in the city's South Side. One such fight left him so badly injured that he required metal plates in one leg and was unable to walk on it for a year. As part of his recovery, he worked with personal trainer and family friend Yaakov Lunen, an African American who had converted to Orthodox Judaism. Lunen's influence inspired Murray and his entire family to pursue a deeper relationship to Judaism. Murray began attending a weekly class at a local yeshivah; there, he encountered two rabbis from Aish HaTorah who persuaded him to come study at their yeshivah in Israel, where he ended up settling.

Career
Murray began rapping professionally while living in Seattle. He recorded his first album at age 19 under the name Madsteez and performed at shows throughout the West Coast. He also performed as an MC and DJ in the city's house and drum and bass scenes.

At Aish HaTorah, Murray initially gave up rapping to focus on his studies, until one of his rabbis told him it would be a chillul Hashem to repress his talents in such a way.

Shtar

In 2006, Murray met fellow Aish HaTorah student Brad Rubinstein, who had previously been a guitarist in the short-lived English trip hop band Lisp. They began writing music together and formed Shtar, initially as a duo, before adding a full band to strengthen their live performance. They released their debut album, Infinity through Shemspeed in 2012, followed by their Boss EP, which featured Murray's fellow Seattle native D. Black on the song "Rabbit Hole". They competed on the 2015-16 season of the Israeli reality singing competition HaKokhav HaBa, coming in ninth place.

Personal life
Murray currently lives in Beit Shemesh with his wife and children. In addition to his music career, he teaches kung fu and works in real estate. He has also written for The Times of Israel as a blogger.

Discography

 Infinity (2011)
 Boss EP (2012)

References

External links
 Shtar official website

Living people
Jewish American musicians
Jewish rappers
Musicians from Seattle
Haredi rabbis in Israel
Baalei teshuva
American emigrants to Israel
Israeli people of Irish descent
Alternative hip hop musicians
Israeli rappers
21st-century American Jews
Year of birth missing (living people)